The MTV Romania Music Awards have been held since 2002 celebrating Romanian music. Recipients of the awards have been Eurovision contestants and some have gone on to represent Romania in the competition. The awards were usually held in June. Since 2008 the show was cancelled. Starting then, it was replaced by the Romanian Music Awards, organized by Music Channel Romania.

Locations
 July, 2002 - Palatul Copiilor, Bucharest
 June 5, 2003 – Sala Polivalentă, Bucharest
 June 3, 2004 – Sala Palatului, Bucharest
 April 23, 2005 – Sala Palatului, Bucharest
 June 3, 2006 – Sala Sporturilor Horia Demian, Cluj-Napoca
 May 10, 2007 – Piaţa Mare, Sibiu

Winners

2002

 Best Photography, video of the year: Zdob si Zdub
 Best Pop Video: Directia 5 - Tot ce vrei. Director: Lucian Blaga
 Best Rock Video: Iris, Da, da, eu stiu. Director: Tudor Gramescu
 Best Dance Video: Class, Intr-o zi. Director: Class
 Best R&B: Cristina Spatar, Mesaj de dragoste
 Best female artist in a video: Paula Seling
 Best male artist in a video: Pepe
 Best choreography: Simplu
 Best debut: Cristiana Raduta
 Best Editing: Vama Veche
 Best Special Effects: Mamelino & O-zone
 Best Direction and Video of a band: Partizan - Fata mea. Director: Andreea Paduraru

2003

 Best Rock: Iris//Uriah Heep
 Best DJ: Rhadoo
 Best Group: Class
 Best Male: Marius Moga
 Best Female: Andra
 Best Live: Voltaj
 Best website: www.annes.ro
 Best New Act: Unu VS. George Nicolescu
 Best Song: O-Zone
 Best Dance: O-Zone
 Best Hip-Hop: Paraziţii
 Best Pop: Class
 Best Album: Animal X
 Best Video: Zdob şi Zdub
 Life Time Award: Phoenix
 Free Your Mind: "Litoralul pentru toţi" – Dan Matei Agathon

2004

 Best Female: Loredana - Femeia ta
 Best Male: Ştefan Bănică, Jr. - Am s-o aştept
 Best Pop: Class - Luna mi-a zâmbit
 Best Album: BUG Mafia - Băieţi buni
 Best Etno: Zdob şi Zdub - Everybody in the casa mare
 Best Song:  3rei Sud Est - Clipe
 Best Hip-Hop: B.U.G. Mafia - Româneşte
 Best Group: Voltaj - Noapte bună
 Best Dance: O-Zone - Dragostea din tei
 Best Rock: Cargo - Daca ploaia s-ar opri
 Best Video: Andra feat. Tiger One - Vreau sărutarea ta
 Best New Act: Spicy - Bikini party
 Best Live: Viţa de vie
 Best Website: www.gia.ro
 Free Your Mind: Paşi spre toleranţă (McCann Erickson)
 Life Time Achievement Award: Gică Petrescu

2005

 Best Hip-Hop: Ombladon ft. Raku - Egali Din Naştere
 Best New Act: Pavel Stratan - Eu Beu
 Best Female: Nicola - Îţi Mulţumesc
 Best Male: Pepe - Numai Iubirea
 Best Song: Activ - Doar Cu Tine
 Best Album: Parazitii - Primii 10 Ani
 Best Live Act: Viţa de vie - ClubJ, MTV Live
 Best Website: www.andreeab.ro
 Best Dance: Morandi - Love Me
 Best Etno: Etnic & Haiducii - Zorilor
 Best Pop: Directia 5 - Eşti Îngerul Meu
 Best Group: Voltaj - Şi Ce?
 Best Rock: Cargo - Nu Pot Trăi Fără Tine
 Best Video: Sensor - Help Yourself
 Lifetime Award: Teo Peter (Awarded posthumously)

2006

 Best Group: Akcent (Dragoste de închiriat)
 Best Song: Morandi (Beijo (Uh la la))
 Best Female: Loredana (Le le)
 Best Male: Ştefan Bănică, Jr. (Numele tău)
 Best Hip-Hop: Paraziţii (Violent)
 Best New Act: Heaven (Pentru totdeauna)
 Best Dance: DJ Project (Şoapte)
 Best Album: Pavel Stratan (Amintiri din copilărie)
 Best Rock: Iris (Maxima)
 Best Pop: Voltaj (Povestea oricui)
 Best Live Performance: Proconsul (Iaşi 2005, MTV Live)
 Best Video: Morandi (Falling asleep)
 Free Your Mind Award: Soknan Han Jung

2007

 Best Group: Simplu - Oficial îmi merge bine
 Best Song: Cleopatra Stratan - Ghiţă
 Best Female: Andreea Bănică - Fiesta
 Best Male: Ştefan Bănică, Jr. - Toata lumea dansează
 Best Hip-Hop: Cheloo - Operaţiunea c*r pansat
 Best New Artist: Cleopatra Stratan - Ghiţă
 Best Dance: DJ Project - Eşti tot ce am
 Best Album: Activ - Everyday
 Best Rock: Iris - Vino pentru totdeauna
 Best Live Act: Ştefan Bănică, Jr.
 Best Pop: Direcţia 5 - Stai! Nu mă ocoli
 Best Video: Simplu - Oficial îmi merge bine
 Best Website: www.trupaheaven.ro
 Best Alternative: Șuie Paparude - Armada verbală
 Best International Artist: Sean Paul

See also
 MTV Romania

References

External links
 MTV Romania Official website

Romanian music awards
MTV
Music video awards